Reza Najfar (born 20 April 1960) is a flute player and composer from Tehran, Iran, living in Austria. Since 1992, he is professor for flute at the Tiroler Landeskonservatorium in Innsbruck and the Prayner Konservatorium in Vienna.

Biography 
Najfar studied music and flute in Tehran, Utrecht and Vienna.

During his studies, he was employed as a solo-flautist at the United Stages Vienna (Vereinigte Bühnen Wien).

Career
In 2008, Reza Najfar won the "Persian Golden Lioness Award", in the category "Award for Excellence in Music", from the World Academy of Arts, Literature and Media (WAALM), which is located in London.

Discography 
 Serenata Italiana (with Esther Schobel, guitar) (1996)
 Divertimento Italiano (with Alexander Swete, guitar) (1998)
 The Magic Alto Flute (with Erich Faltermeier, piano) (1997)
 Tango Appassionato (with Alexander Swete, guitar) (1999)
 The Rare Encore (with Megumi Otsuka, piano) (2001)
 The Other Chopin (with Fausto Quintabà, piano) (2009)
 Slow Motion (with Fausto Quintabà, piano) (2011)
 Rare Encores (with Megumi Otsuka, piano) (2017)
 Bach & Bach (alto flute, solo) (2019)

References

External links 

 Official Website
 Spotify Page

Iranian flautists
Living people
1960 births